Sahitya Akademi Award is given each year by the Sahitya Akademi (India's National Academy of Letters) to writers and their works for their outstanding contribution to the upliftment of Indian literature, Nepali literature being one of them.

Winners

References

Sahitya Akademi Award

Nepali
Sahitya Akademi Award winners
Nepali literary institutions